The longhorn sculpin (Myoxocephalus octodecemspinosus) is a species of marine ray-finned fish belonging to the family Cottidae, the typical sculpins.This species is found in the  Northwest Atlantic Ocean. It is a predatory and scavenging fish that can feed on the remains of other organisms.

Taxonomy
The longhorn sculpin was first formally described as Cottus 18-spinosus in 1814 by the American physician and naturalist Samuel L. Mitchill with its type locality given as New York. The ICZN required that the specific name be changed to octodecemspinosus. The specific name, octodecemspinosus, means “18 spined”, an allusion to the number of spines on the head (which is actually 20).

Appearance 
The longhorn sculpin varies in color with its surroundings. It has four tinted bands on the back of its body, which range from dark brown to tinted yellow and dark olive in color. When the fish is resting on sand or dirt, it is plain in color, but when resting on pebbles, it is variably marked in order to blend in with its surroundings in both scenarios. The dorsal spines and head spines on the fish are very sharp, and one must be careful if they are to handle it. It has two variably marked dorsal fins, along with two pectorals and an anal fin.

Occurrence 
The range extends from Newfoundland and the Gulf of Saint Lawrence to Virginia. It is a demersal species that lives in  shallow coastal waters, moving to deeper water in winter. It is commonly found at depths of 50 fathoms deep, but can be found as deep as 105 fathoms.

References

External links
 Myoxocephalus octodecemspinosus (Longhorn Sculpin) at the Encyclopedia of Life

octodecemspinosus
Fish of the Atlantic Ocean
Fish described in 1814
Taxa named by Samuel L. Mitchill